Dennis A Young (born 1944), is a male former diver who competed for England.

Diving career
He represented England in the 3 metres springboard at the 1962 British Empire and Commonwealth Games in Perth, Western Australia.

Four years later he was selected again for the springboard event at the 1966 British Empire and Commonwealth Games in Kingston, Jamaica.

References

1944 births
English male divers
Divers at the 1962 British Empire and Commonwealth Games
Divers at the 1966 British Empire and Commonwealth Games
Living people
Commonwealth Games competitors for England